Thomas Duane Arnold (born March 6, 1959) is an American actor and comedian. He is best known for playing Arnie Thomas on Roseanne (1989–1993), Jackie Thomas on The Jackie Thomas Show (1992–1993), Tom Graham on Tom (1994), and Tom Amross on The Tom Show (1997–1998).

He has appeared in several films, including True Lies (1994), Nine Months (1995), McHale's Navy (1997), Animal Factory (2000), Cradle 2 the Grave (2003), Mr. 3000 (2004), Happy Endings (2005), Pride (2007), The Great Buck Howard (2008), and Madea's Witness Protection (2011). He was also the host of The Best Damn Sports Show Period for four years, and appeared on Sons of Anarchy.

Early life
Arnold was born Thomas Duane Arnold in Ottumwa, Iowa, the son of Linda Kay (née Graham) and Jack Arnold. He had 2 siblings: a sister Lori and a brother Scott. As a child, Tom Arnold was diagnosed with autism. His mother abandoned the family when he was a child, and he and his siblings were raised by their father: 

In their teens, Arnold and his sister moved back in with their mother. With her mother's consent, Lori was married at age 14 to a man who was 23 years old. Soon Lori was a heavy drug user and dealer running one of the largest meth operations in the Midwest until her arrest in 1989.

Meanwhile, Arnold apparently escaped his sister's fate, and worked at a meatpacking plant. He attended Ottumwa High School, Indian Hills Community College, and from 1981 to 1983, the University of Iowa, where he studied business administration and writing.

Career

In the early 1980s, Arnold had a prop-based comedy routine called "Tom Arnold and the Goldfish Review." Roseanne Barr brought him in as a writer for her television sitcom, Roseanne. He married her in 1990, after she divorced her first husband. Arnold wrote himself into the show as the character "Arnie Thomas" (a play on his name). The couple's marriage attracted media and especially tabloid attention due to their sometimes outrageous behavior. In 1992, Arnold starred in his own sitcom, The Jackie Thomas Show. Airing after Roseanne on ABC, the show lasted 18 episodes.

In 1993, Arnold and Barr bought a house together in Arnold's hometown of Eldon, Iowa and opened a restaurant, 'Roseanne and Tom's Big Food Diner' nearby. The diner served loosemeat sandwiches similar to the specialty of the fictional Lanford Lunch Box on Roseanne, which in turn was based on the real-life Canteen Lunch in the Alley in Ottumwa. Both appeared in the 1993 movie The Woman Who Loved Elvis, filmed in Ottumwa. Arnold and Barr divorced in 1994 due to irreconcilable differences. Their restaurant closed in 1995.

After Arnold's divorce from Barr, he narrated and starred in several Craftmatic Adjustable Bed commercials that aired throughout 1995. The last commercial that he filmed culminated in Arnold lying in a bed that caught on fire and melted a strand of his underarm hair during the taping; the footage was never released. Arnold commented on Twitter in 2014: "Me and Mike (Michael Jackson) (he was one of my best friends) used to laugh about how [I] had a Pepsi commercial of my own".

In November 2000, Arnold played the role of Al Raymond in the second-season Baywatch Hawaii episode, "The Cage".

In a late 1990s interview on radio's The Howard Stern Show, Arnold admitted that his share of his and Barr's estate amounted to "over $20,000,000", including a percentage of the Roseanne ABC-TV series, but would not elaborate, citing a confidentiality clause. In 1994, Arnold appeared as the sidekick to Arnold Schwarzenegger's character in James Cameron's action blockbuster film True Lies. From 2001 through 2005, he was one of the hosts of The Best Damn Sports Show Period. From 2003 to 2005, Arnold was the voice of Arby's "Oven Mitt" commercials.

Arnold had his first romantic leading man part in the 2005 movie Happy Endings. That same year, Arnold starred in The Kid & I. From 2008 to 2011, he hosted the CMT show My Big Redneck Wedding. He hosted CMT's The Biggest Redneck Wedding Ever in 2008, in which he served as the wedding planner, created a wedding that exceeded the dreams of a couple who wanted to be married in a mud bog, and performed the actual ceremony. CMT also made three series of "My Big Redneck Vacation" presented by Arnold and featuring the Clampet Family from Shreveport, Louisiana.

Arnold's role as a child molester in Gardens of the Night sparked revelations that he had been a victim of sexual abuse in his childhood. He decided to take on the role to shed more light on the issue.

In January 2017, Tom Arnold was revealed as a celebrity contestant on the Australian edition of I'm A Celebrity...Get Me Out of Here!.
He was the first evictee from the jungle, after 17 days, and stated he was paid between $US600,000 and $US700,000 for his participation in the program. In June 2017, Arnold filed a lawsuit against companies Network Ten and 'A List Entertainment' for defrauding him for being on I'm a Celebrity...Get Me Out of Here!. Arnold claims that he was promised a payment of $425,000 and a comedy tour in Australia. However, he was missing $140,000 in payment and Network Ten backed out of the comedy tour.

In 2018, Arnold's Viceland show The Hunt for the Trump Tapes premiered to low ratings and mainly negative reviews. The show was canceled after one season.

Personal life

Arnold met comedian Roseanne Barr when she saw his act in 1983. Their relationship was complicated by his alcoholism and drug addiction, but eventually he became sober. The two married in 1990 and divorced in 1994. In an April 2009 interview on Anytime with Bob Kushell, Arnold discussed why when he divorced Barr, he did not take any alimony. During the next ten years, Arnold married two subsequent times. Both marriages ended in divorce. In August 2008, Arnold broke his scapula in a motorcycle accident on the Pacific Coast Highway.

Over Thanksgiving weekend 2009, Arnold married his fourth wife, Ashley Groussman, in Maui before 75 guests. Dax Shepard served as Arnold's best man. He appeared December 10, 2009 on the late night talk show Asia Uncut. The couple have two children and four dogs. In January 2019, the couple announced their intention to divorce. The divorce was finalized in July 2020.

Arnold was raised a Methodist. Some sources say he converted to Judaism upon marrying Roseanne Barr in 1990, but in a podcast interview with Andrew Santino he speaks of growing up Jewish in Iowa. Arnold has denied converting to Judaism. He still practices Judaism.

Arnold has given much of his time to charities including giving out toys during the holidays to those in need through the Miracle on 1st Street Toy Giveaway, an annual tradition of his.

Involvement in Falwell scandal
In 2019, Arnold tape-recorded a phone call with Michael Cohen where Cohen divulged his involvement in the cover-up of a scandal involving Jerry Falwell Jr., his wife, and a pool boy.

Family reunion

On October 8, 2020, Tom Arnold, his brother Scott, and sister Lori reunited for the first time in 28 years, back together again in their hometown of Ottumwa, Iowa. During this time, Lori was filming a 3-part docu-series called Queen of Meth, which her brother Tom helped to produce. It recounts her time as the “queen-pin” of a huge drug business that she ran from Iowa to California. Queen of Meth was originally released on Discovery+ in May 2021.

Filmography

Film

Television

References

External links

 
 

1959 births
Male actors from Iowa
American male film actors
American male comedians
21st-century American comedians
American male television actors
American male voice actors
American television hosts
Jewish American male actors
Jewish American male comedians
Indian Hills Community College alumni
Living people
Actors with autism
People from Ottumwa, Iowa
University of Iowa alumni
I'm a Celebrity...Get Me Out of Here! (Australian TV series) participants
21st-century American Jews
Liberalism in the United States
Disney people